This is the list of cathedrals in Norway sorted by denomination.

Lutheran
Cathedrals of the Church of Norway:
 Nidaros Cathedral in Trondheim
 Oslo Cathedral in Oslo
 Bergen Cathedral in Bergen
 Bodø Cathedral in Bodø
 Fredrikstad Cathedral in Fredrikstad
 Hamar Cathedral in Hamar
 Kristiansand Cathedral in Kristiansand
 Molde Cathedral in Molde
 Stavanger Cathedral in Stavanger
 Tønsberg Cathedral in Tønsberg
 Tromsø Cathedral in Tromsø

Roman Catholic 

Cathedrals of the Roman Catholic Church in Norway:
 St. Olav's Cathedral in Trondheim
 Pro-Cathedral of St. Olav in Oslo
 Cathedral of Our Lady in Tromsø

Ruins 
Cathedral Ruins in Norway
 St. Hallvard's Cathedral in Oslo
 Christ Church In Bergen
 Cathedral Ruins in Hamar

See also

List of cathedrals
Christianity in Norway

References

 
Cathedrals
Norway
Cathedrals